The San Sebastian Cathedral, also referred to as the Tarlac Cathedral, is a post-war, Neo-Gothic church located in Brgy. Mabini, Tarlac City, Philippines. The cathedral, which was dedicated to Saint Sebastian in 1686, is the seat of the Roman Catholic Diocese of Tarlac.

Parish history
The town of Tarlac was said to have been established in 1686 by priests assigned to Magalang, Pampanga. The town was managed by the Augustinians from Pampanga until in 1725, a petition was brought to the attention of the Father Provincial to separate Tarlac from its distant matrix. In 1727, the separation was fulfilled with Tarlac being declared an independent parish. In 1757, however, the parish of Tarlac was annexed back to Magalang for quite some time.

Architectural history
The first parochial building of Tarlac is attributed to Father Agustin Barriocanal in 1740. Later on, in 1872, a wood and stone church was erected by Father Baltasar Gamarra. Construction of the said structure lasted until 1875 by Father Tomas Fito and was completed by Father Fermin Sardon in 1890. The finished church was said to have been identical to the church of Concepcion. The church was completely destroyed during the war, in 1945. It was later rebuilt into the present-day church structure.

References

External links
 

Roman Catholic churches in Tarlac
Roman Catholic cathedrals in the Philippines
Buildings and structures in Tarlac City
1686 establishments in the Philippines
Gothic Revival church buildings in the Philippines
Roman Catholic churches completed in 1686
17th-century Roman Catholic church buildings in the Philippines